The Midland Oak is an oak tree that grows in Leamington Spa, Warwickshire, near the Lillington boundary, at the junction of Lillington Road and Lillington Avenue.

A plaque nearby unveiled in 1988 states that the old tree, the original centuries old Midland Oak  was reputed to mark the centre of England. The present tree was planted about 1988, grown from an acorn saved in 1967 when the old tree, which had died, was cut down. 
The tree survived the extensive work carried out in 2002, when an underground stream, the Bins Brook, was exposed and an overflow basin was created, to prevent the flooding of nearby houses.

See also
 List of individual trees

References

External links
Picture of the Midland Oak
Picture of the fields near the Midland Oak

Individual oak trees
Tourist attractions in Warwickshire
Leamington Spa
Individual trees in England
1960s individual tree deaths